The 1996 Hopman Cup was the eighth edition of the Hopman Cup that was held at the Burswood Entertainment Complex, in Perth, Western Australia.

Teams

' – Iva Majoli and Goran Ivanišević (champions)' – Brenda Schultz-McCarthy and Richard Krajicek
 – Martina Hingis and Marc Rosset (finalists)''
 – Amanda Coetzer and Wayne Ferreira

5.   – Chanda Rubin and Richey Reneberg
6.   – Nicole Bradtke and Mark Philippoussis
7.   – Anke Huber and Martin Sinner
8.   – Catherine Tanvier and Arnaud Boetsch

Final

External links 

Hopman Cups by year
Hopman Cup